Virginia's 37th House of Delegates district elects one of 100 seats in the Virginia House of Delegates, the lower house of the state's bicameral legislature. District 37 represents Fairfax City and part of Fairfax County. The seat is currently held by David Bulova.

District officeholders

References

Virginia House of Delegates districts
Government in Fairfax County, Virginia
Fairfax, Virginia